The Himalayan keelback (Herpetoreas platyceps) is a species of grass snake in the family Colubridae. The species is endemic to South Asia.

Geographic range
H. platyceps is known from India along the sub-Himalayan region, Nepal, Bangladesh, Pakistan, Bhutan and China between 1000 and 3600 m elevation (about 3,300 to 11,800 feet).

Description
H. platyceps has the following characteristics: Eye moderate; rostral just visible from above; suture between the internasals as long as that between the pre-frontals or shorter; frontal longer than its distance from the end of the snout, shorter than the parietals; loreal longer than deep ; one preocular (sometimes divided); two or three postoculars; temporals 1+1, or 1+2, or 2+2; 8 upper labials, third, fourth, and fifth entering the eye; 4 or 5 lower labials in contact with the anterior chin shields, which are much shorter than the posterior chin shields.

Dorsal scales in 19 rows, faintly or feebly keeled. 177-235 ventrals; anal divided; subcaudals 75-107, also divided.

Olive-brown above, with small black spots; frequently two black parallel lines or an elliptic marking on the nape; a light, black-edged streak on each side of the head, or a black line from eye to gape (corner of mouth); belly yellowish, with or without blackish dots; frequently a black line or series of elongate blackish spots along each side of the belly; lower surface of tail frequently mottled with blackish; throat sometimes black. In life, a coral-red band is said to run along the ends of the ventrals.

Total length 90 cm (3 feet); tail 23 cm (9 inches).

Notes

References

Further reading
Blyth E (1855). "Notices and descriptions of various reptiles, new or little known [part 2]". J. Asiatic Soc. Bengal, Calcutta 23 (3): 287-302 [1854].
Cardew AG (1896). "A rough key to the identification of Indian ophidia". J. Bombay Nat. Hist. Soc. 10: 585–596.
Hubrecht AAW (1882). "List of reptiles and amphibians brought from British India by Mr. Francis Day". Notes Leyden Mus., Leiden 4: 138–144.
Kramer E (1977). "Zur Schlangenfauna Nepals ". Rev. suisse Zool. 84 (3): 721–761. (in German).
Malnate EV (1966). "Amphiesma platyceps (Blyth) and Amphiesma sieboldii (Günther): sibling species (Reptilia: Serpentes)". J. Bombay Nat. Hist. Soc. 63 (1): 1-17.
Schleich HH, Kästle W (2002). Amphibians and Reptiles of Nepal. Königstein: Koeltz Scientific Books. 1,200 pp.
Shaw GE, Shebbeare EO, Barker PE (1939). "The snakes of northern Bengal and Sikkim, Part 4. The colubrine snakes". J. Darjeeling Nat. Hist. Soc. 13: 114–123.
Shaw GE, Shebbeare EO, Barker PE (2000). The snakes of Sikkim and Bengal [reprint]. Delhi: Asiatic Publishing House. 125 pp.
Steindachner F (1867). "Ueber drei neue Schlangenarten [Calamaria philippinica]". Verh. zool.-botan. Ges. Wien 17: 513–516. (in German).
Tillack F (2003). "Über die Verbreitung und Biologie der Himalaya-Gebirgswassernatter Amphiesma platyceps (Blyth 1854) und einen Fall von Amphigonia retardata (Serpentes: Colubridae: Natricinae) ". Sauria 25 (1): 21–27. (in German).
Wall F (1913). "A new snake of the genus Tropidonotus from the Eastern Himalayas. Tropidonotus Firthi, spec. nov. ". J. Bombay Nat. Hist. Soc. 23: 166.
Wall F (1923). "A Hand-list of the Snakes of the Indian Empire. Part 2". J. Bombay Nat. Hist. Soc. 29: 598–632.

platyceps
Taxa named by Edward Blyth
Reptiles described in 1854
Reptiles of Nepal
Reptiles of India
Reptiles of Bangladesh
Reptiles of Pakistan
Reptiles of Bhutan